Zoth Ommog Records was a German Industrial music record label which was owned by the parent label Music Research. The company was established by German music producer Andreas Tomalla (aka Talla 2XLC) in 1989 and later handed over to producer Torben Schmidt.  The label released albums for such bands as Leæther Strip, X Marks the Pedwalk, Bigod 20, Lights of Euphoria and Klinik between 1989 and 1999.

The company based its name on the fictional character Zoth-Ommog in the Cthulhu Mythos.

In the United States, many of the Zoth Ommog artists were released domestically under Cleopatra Records and Metropolis Records.

Discography

See also 
 List of record labels

References

External links 
 Zoth Ommog Tribute Site (German only)
 
  Official merchandise sales

German independent record labels
Record labels established in 1989
Record labels disestablished in 1999
Industrial record labels